The Stones of Venice is a three-volume treatise on Venetian art and architecture by English art historian John Ruskin, first published from 1851 to 1853.

The Stones of Venice examines Venetian architecture in detail, describing for example over eighty churches. Ruskin discusses architecture of Venice's Byzantine, Gothic, and Renaissance periods, and provides a general history of the city.

Views on art and society
As well as being an art historian, Ruskin was a social reformer. He set out to prove how Venetian architecture exemplified the principles he discussed in his earlier work, The Seven Lamps of Architecture. In the chapter "The Nature of Gothic" (from volume 2), Ruskin gives his views on how society should be organised.
We want one man to be always thinking, and another to be always working, and we call one a gentleman, and the other an operative; whereas the workman ought often to be thinking, and the thinker often to be working, and both should be gentlemen, in the best sense. As it is, we make both ungentle, the one envying, the other despising, his brother; and the mass of society is made up of morbid thinkers and miserable workers. Now it is only by labour that thought can be made healthy, and only by thought that labour can be made happy, and the two cannot be separated with impunity.

Research and publication
Ruskin had visited Venice before, but he made two visits to Venice with his wife Effie specially to research the book. The first visit was in the winter of 1849-50. The first volume of The Stones of Venice appeared in 1851 and Ruskin spent another winter in Venice researching the next two volumes. His research methods included sketching and photography (by 1849 he had acquired his own camera so that he could take daguerreotypes).

Publication history

First editions

The Stones of Venice. Volume the First. The Foundations, 1851, Smith, Elder & Co., London
The Stones of Venice. Volume the Second. The Sea-stories, 1853, Smith, Elder & Co., London
The Stones of Venice. Volume the Third. The Fall, 1853, Smith, Elder & Co., London

Shortened editions
Various shortened editions of the book have been published, including one edited by J. G. Links published in the USA in 1960.

See also
John Henry Devereux

Notes

External links
The Stones of Venice (Introductions) at Project Gutenberg
Volume 1 at Archive.org
Volume 2 at Archive.org
Volume 3 at Archive.org
 

Books about Venice
Architectural treatises
1851 non-fiction books
Art history books
Books by John Ruskin
Venice in art